Protimuhurtey is the debut album of Bangladeshi heavy metal band Stentorian released on October, 2005. This album is most notable for exceptionally strong lyric and melodic composition, compiling of a full-length studio album. The most notable songs from this album include Adrissho Juddho 2, Bidrohi, Jolosrot, Anubhuti and Mone pore na.

Track listing

Personnel

Stentorian
 Torsha Khan - Vocals (2001-2008)
James Kabir — Guitars, Backup Vocals
Tutul Rashid - Guitars
Rafiul Habib - Drums, Percussion
Shams Alim Biswas — Bass, Backup vocals, vocals on track "Mone pore na" and “Anubhuti“
Tanim Sufyani— Vocals

Guest musicians
Iqbal Asif Jewel (Miles) — Guitar solo on "Mone pore na?"

Album art and design

 Zahidul Haque Apu

References

Stentorian albums
2005 albums
Bengali-language albums